The Wailing Siren Mystery is Volume 30 in the original The Hardy Boys Mystery Stories published by Grosset & Dunlap.

This book was written for the Stratemeyer Syndicate by Andrew E. Svenson in 1951. Between 1959 and 1973 the first 38 volumes of this series were systematically revised as part of a project directed by Harriet Adams, Edward Stratemeyer's daughter. The original version of this book was shortened in 1968 by Priscilla Baker-Carr resulting in two similar stories sharing the same title.

Plot summary

Their SOS ignored by a strange yacht in a storm, the Hardy Boys find a wallet alongside their speedboat, apparently dropped from a helicopter, containing two thousand dollars, and are launched into a mystery involving diverse clues. This includes finding out who kidnapped Jack Wayne and took his plane, and where the wailing siren is coming from.

References

The Hardy Boys books
1951 American novels
1951 children's books
1968 American novels
1968 children's books
Grosset & Dunlap books